The 2017 Indonesia President's Cup Final was a football match that determined the winner of the 2017 Indonesia President's Cup. The match was held at the Pakansari Stadium in Bogor on 12 March 2017.

Background
Pusamania Borneo qualified for the final after surprisingly defeating defending champions Persib Bandung on penalties. Arema advanced to the 2017 President's Cup Final after a dramatic win over Semen Padang. The final match was certainly attended by President Joko Widodo.

Route to the final

Note: In all results below, the score of the finalist is given first (H: home; A: away).

Match

Details

Statistics

See also
 2017 Indonesian League 1
 2017 Indonesian League 2
 2017 Indonesian League 3

References

External links

2017 in Indonesian sport